Beba’ (Bebadji, Mubadji) is a Grassfields Bantu language spoken in Cameroon.

References

Ngemba languages
Languages of Cameroon